The Barge Inn is an independent public house and restaurant in Grimsby, United Kingdom. Housed within a refitted former grain barge, it has been moored in the town centre Riverhead quay since 1982.

History
The Barge was crane lifted into Grimsby's Riverhead quay from the adjacent Alexandra Dock in 1982. A former grain barge, it was converted into a public house and has since remained permanently moored in this position. It is moored with a distinctive tilt to its starboard side.

In 2017, the establishment was threatened with removal to accommodate North East Lincolnshire Council plans to build a cinema complex in Grimsby town centre. A petition to save the Barge attracted almost 8,500 signatures, and it was subsequently announced that it would be remaining in its current position.

References

External links

Pubs in Lincolnshire
Culture in Lincolnshire
Buildings and structures in Grimsby